Padgett Powell (born April 25, 1952 in Gainesville, Florida) is an American novelist in the Southern literary tradition. His debut novel, Edisto (1984), was nominated for the American Book Award and was excerpted in The New Yorker.

Powell has written five more novels—including A Woman Named Drown (1987); Edisto Revisited (1996), a sequel to his debut; Mrs. Hollingsworth's Men (2000); The Interrogative Mood: A Novel? (2009); and You & Me (2012), his most recent—and three collections of short stories. In addition to The New Yorker, Powell's work has appeared in The Paris Review, Harper's, Grand Street, Oxford American, The New York Times Book Review, and other publications.

Powell has been a writing professor at the University of Florida since 1984.

Awards and honors
1984 American Book Award, nomination, Edisto
1986 Whiting Award
1987 Rome Fellowship in Literature from The American Academy of Arts and Letters.
2011 James Tait Black Memorial Prize, You & Me

Works
Novels
 Edisto (1984)
 A Woman Named Drown (1987)
 Edisto Revisited (1996)
 Mrs. Hollingsworth's Men (2000; reissued in 2014 as Hologram)
 The Interrogative Mood: A Novel? (2009)
 You & Me (2012)

Story collections
 Typical (1991)
 Aliens of Affection (1998)
 Cries for Help, Various (2015)

Essay collection
 Indigo (2021)

Essays
 "Tangled Up in Indigo," Garden & Gun, April/May 2015
 "Padget Powell on Donald Barthelme," "Tin House" (blog), October 15, 2015

References

External links 
 Profile at The Whiting Foundation
 Interview with Padgett Powell at "The Faster Times"
 Padgett Powell faculty page at the University of Florida, Department of English
 2006 interview in The Believer
 "Wayne in the Desert", a short story from Mississippi Review (1996)
 "Dizzy", a short story from "Unsaid Magazine" Vol. 1, n. 1
 

20th-century American novelists
21st-century American novelists
American male novelists
University of Florida faculty
University of Houston alumni
Living people
1952 births
James Tait Black Memorial Prize recipients
Writers from Gainesville, Florida
American male short story writers
20th-century American short story writers
21st-century American short story writers
20th-century American male writers
21st-century American male writers
Novelists from Florida